Myoxomorpha alvarengorum is a species of beetle in the family Cerambycidae. It was described by Monné and Magno in 1990.

References

Acanthoderini
Beetles described in 1990